Mikhail Khovanov (born 1972) is a Russian-American professor of mathematics at Columbia University who works on representation theory, knot theory, and algebraic topology. He is known for introducing Khovanov homology for links, which was one of the first examples of categorification.

Education and career
Khovanov graduated from Moscow State School 57 mathematical class in 1988. He earned a PhD in mathematics from Yale University in 1997, where he studied under Igor Frenkel.

Khovanov was a faculty member at UC Davis before moving to Columbia University.

He is a half-brother of Tanya Khovanova.

References

External links
Khovanov's faculty page at Columbia.
List of Khovanov's publications.

1972 births
Living people
20th-century American mathematicians
21st-century American mathematicians
Topologists
Columbia University faculty
Yale University alumni